Haakon Sandberg (b. Haakon Philip Fretheim Aall Sandberg; 30 August 1924, Bergen, Norway - 30 December 2013) was a Norwegian film director.

His interest in films began when he and his twin brother, Sverre, received a film projector as a gift from an aunt at the age of 6.

After having studied cinematography in Copenhagen, he and Sverre, who had studied at the New York Institute of Photography, started Svekon Film, a production company, in 1948.

He is the father of film director Øyvind Sandberg.

He was married to Liv, who was also  involved in the making of his movies.

Filmography (selection)
Gråpus som forsvant, 1955
Bergen Havn, 1958
Anno, 10 movies (including Bergen, et møtested for mennesker), 1960-1992 
Uten opprør, 1972
Hanseatene, 1979
To hus tett i tett, 1985

Awards
Venice Film Festival Prize for Gråpus som forsvant

References

1924 births
2013 deaths
Mass media people from Bergen
Norwegian film directors